Neotibicen bermudianus, also colloquially known as the Bermuda cicada is a presumably extinct species of annual cicada endemic to the island of Bermuda. Populations of this species were historically abundant on Bermuda, but they plummeted sharply in the middle twentieth century after the decline of their preferred host: the Bermuda cedar. It is currently uncertain if this species is permanently extinct or if their numbers have been reduced substantially and relict populations still exist on the archipelago.

Neotibicen lyricen, the lyric cicada; of the Eastern United States, is the most closely related species of Neotibicen behaviorally, morphologically, and genetically to the Bermuda cicada.

External links

Endemic fauna of Bermuda
Insects described in 1902
Cryptotympanini